Thomas Grossett was a Scottish professional golfer who played in the late 19th century. Grossett tied for fourth place in the 1886 Open Championship.

Early life
Grossett was born in Scotland, circa 1862.

1886 Open Championship
The 1886 Open Championship was held 5 November at the Musselburgh Links, Musselburgh, East Lothian, Scotland. David Brown won by two strokes from Willie Campbell.

Details of play
The contest consisted of four rounds over the 9-hole course. There were 42 entries including seven amateurs. Horace Hutchinson and Johnny Laidlay were the two leading amateurs playing. Local Musselburgh professionals dominated the field, providing 19 of the professional entries.

Brown and John Lambert led after the first round, both scoring 38. Lambert and Willie Campbell led after two rounds on 78 with Brown on 79 with Willie Fernie and Campbell. Brown had an excellent 37 in the third round and took a one stroke lead over Willie Campbell. They both fared badly at the 3rd hole where Brown took 7 and Campbell took 8. Campbell was ahead in the final round until he took 7 at the 5th, having been bunkered twice on the hole.

Eventually Brown finished two ahead of Campbell, finishing with two threes to Campbell's two fours. Willie Park, Jr. finished strongly but his chances were ruined by taking 34 on the first six holes of his first round. Grossett, carding rounds of 43-37-39-42=161, took advantage of other golfers' miscues to finish high on the final leaderboard. His share of the prize fund was £1.

Results in The Open Championship

Note: Grossett played only in The Open Championship.

WD = withdrew
"T" indicates a tie for a place
Yellow background for top-10

References

Scottish male golfers